The Baptist Convention of Tanzania  is a Baptist Christian denomination, affiliated with the Baptist World Alliance, in Tanzania. The headquarters is in Dar es Salaam, Tanzania.

History
The Baptist Convention of Tanzania started in 1956 by an American mission of the International Mission Board.  The Baptist Convention of Tanzania was officially formed in 1971. 

According to a denomination census released in 2020, it claimed 1,300 churches and 2,660,000 members.

Schools
It has 2 affiliated theological institutes.

See also 
 Bible
 Born again
 Worship service (evangelicalism)
 Jesus Christ
 Believers' Church

References

External links
 Official Website

Baptist Christianity in Tanzania
Baptist denominations in Africa